El Degas or El Dégas was a Japanese label for acoustics and electric guitars built to resemble Gibson guitars, and other major guitar companies' designs and distributed by Buegeleisen & Jacobson of New York, New York.

External links
 El Degas user reviews at Harmony Central
 El Degas user forum

Guitar manufacturing companies
Musical instrument manufacturing companies of Japan